Zbigniew Siemiątkowski (born 8 October 1957 in Ciechanów, Poland) is a Polish politician and political scientist.  He was Minister of Internal Affairs, 1996–97, and head of the Intelligence Agency (Agencja Wywiadu, or AW), 2002 – April 2004.

Life 
 1977-1981 studies at the University of Warsaw, earning a master's degree in political science
 1987 doctorate in Humanities, University of Warsaw.
 1981-1991 work in the Department of Journalism and Politics at the University of Warsaw.
 1978- member of the communist PZPR, and its successors, the SdRP and SLD.
 1995 Spokesman for the campaign of Aleksander Kwaśniewski; later appointed Assistant Secretary of State, and Deputy Chief of National Security.
 1996-1997 Minister of Internal Affairs
 2001-2002 Secretary of State
 2002 appointed chief of Agencja Wywiadu.
 2004 resigned from AW.

Rendition charges
On 10 January 2012 Siemiątkowski was charged with "unlawfully depriving prisoners of their liberty" in connection with the Central Intelligence Agency's operation of a Black site in Poland, which was again hidden from the public
. The charges were subsequently withdrawn.

See also
 History of Polish intelligence services
 List of Poles

References

1957 births
Polish United Workers' Party members
Democratic Left Alliance politicians
Members of the Polish Sejm 1991–1993
Members of the Polish Sejm 1993–1997
Members of the Polish Sejm 1997–2001
Members of the Polish Sejm 2001–2005
Living people
Interior ministers of Poland